Ulugbek is an urban-type settlement located in Tashkent Region, Uzbekistan. The population in 1989 was 7,800. The town is administratively subordinated to Mirzo Ulugbek District of Tashkent city.

References

Geography of Tashkent